Aniceto Álvarez Álvarez (born October 24, 1957

) is a former Spanish tennis player who reached as high as the eighth position in the Spanish national ranking.

His best results as a professional came in doubles. He reached the semifinals at the 1976 Swedish Open partnering with Peter Fleming, and lost in the same round at the 1978 Columbus Open, this time alongside Andrés Molina.

References

External links

Spanish male tennis players
Living people
1957 births